O'Neil Bell (29 December 1974 – 25 November 2015) was a Jamaican professional boxer who competed from 1998 to 2011. He held the undisputed cruiserweight title in 2006 and the lineal cruiserweight title from 2006 to 2007.

Professional career
Bell lost his second fight against Algerian amateur star (M. Benguesima) but kept winning for years after that.
He defeated former IBF champion Arthur Williams twice by KO and climbed the rankings.

He defeated Canadian Dale Brown in a controversial but unanimous decision on May 20, 2005, on Friday Night Fights to capture the vacant IBF title.

He unified the title by beating Frenchman Jean-Marc Mormeck on January 7, 2006, for his WBA and WBC belts, making Bell the second undisputed champion of the division, with Evander Holyfield being the first.

The IBF later stripped Bell in April 2006 for pulling out of a mandatory bout against Steve Cunningham because of a tooth problem. After nearly 11 months of inactivity, Bell was due to take part in the postponed Superfighter Tournament at heavyweight on December 1 of that year.

Bell lost the WBA, WBC and lineal cruiserweight titles to Jean-Marc Mormeck on March 17, 2007 in the Frenchman's backyard in Levallois, France via a close but unanimous decision.

On April 19, 2008, in Poland, Bell fought former WBC light heavyweight champion Tomasz Adamek. Bell was dropped in the first round and quit after the end of round seven, complaining of feeling dizzy and sick.

After the Adamek fight, Bell announced his move to the heavyweight division, saying that making the cruiserweight limit sapped his strength for his last two fights. Bell's first heavyweight bout was scheduled to be against Willie Palms on January 14, 2009, but that fight never occurred.

Professional boxing record

Outside the ring
On February 5, 2007, Bell allegedly threw an axe at his sparring partner, Larry Slayton, while training in the woods of Big Bear, California.  He was subsequently arrested for assault with a deadly weapon but was released.

2007 disappearance
According to ESPN's Wednesday Night Fights on August 8, 2007, Bell, who was originally scheduled to appear, was unavailable to fight and could not be contacted in any way. He was scheduled to appear against Louis Azille on the fight card, but his promoter pulled him from the fight three weeks prior because he could not be located.

Death
Bell was shot and killed while being robbed in Atlanta, Georgia, on November 25, 2015.

See also
List of cruiserweight boxing champions
List of WBA world champions
List of WBC world champions
List of IBF world champions
List of The Ring world champions
List of undisputed boxing champions

References

External links

Bell wins the IBF cruiserweight title at ESPN
O'Neil Bell profile at Cyber Boxing Zone

1974 births
2015 deaths
World cruiserweight boxing champions
International Boxing Federation champions
World Boxing Association champions
World Boxing Council champions
Place of birth missing
Jamaican male boxers
Jamaican murder victims
People murdered in Georgia (U.S. state)
Male murder victims
Deaths by firearm in Georgia (U.S. state)
The Ring (magazine) champions